The Sunken Billions is a study jointly published in 2008 by the World Bank and by the Food and Agriculture Organization of the United Nations (FAO).  The report shows that the difference between the potential and actual net economic benefits from marine fisheries is about USD 50 billion per year or some USD 2 trillion over the last three decades.  

According to the report “by improving governance of marine fisheries, society could capture a substantial part of this $50 billion annual economic loss.  Through comprehensive reform, the fisheries sector could become a basis for economic growth and the creation of alternative livelihoods in many countries.  At the same time, a nation’s natural capital in the form of fish stocks could be greatly increased and the negative impacts of the fisheries on the marine environment reduced.”

If fish stock were rebuilt, the current marine catch could be achieved with approximately half of the current global fishing effort.  This illustrates the massive overcapacity of the global fleet.  The excess competition over the limited fish resources results in declining productivity, economic inefficiency, and depressed fisher incomes.

References
 Arnason R, Kelleher K and Willmann R (2008) The Sunken Billions: The Economic Justification for Fisheries Reform. Joint publication of the World Bank and the FAO. .
 FAO Code of Conduct for Responsible Fisheries

External links
 World Bank - Fisheries and Aquaculture
 FAO Fisheries and Aquaculture Department
 Presentation material from the speakers at Conference on Green Fishing Technologies and Solutions - October 7th, 2009 Aalborg, Denmark
 The Sunken Billions Summary on www.illegal-fishing.info

Fisheries science
2008 works